Crossings is an original novel based on the U.S. television series Buffy the Vampire Slayer.

Plot summary

While at the theater for a Star Trek marathon with Anya, Xander recognizes a friend of his, from the arcade, enter the theater and begin threatening and beating humans in a very demonic way. Upon further inspection, Xander learns that his friend, Robby, was involved in total immersion VR video game beta testing. But the testing was a little too secretive, according to Robby's girlfriend. Meanwhile, Buffy and Dawn are having issues with one another, and Buffy doesn't know how to deal with being Dawn's new "mom" after the recent death of their own mother. After much research concerning the bizarre video game tests, and the appearance of a man named Bobby Lee Tooker, the group discovers that the video game isn't so much a video game, as much as it is another dimensional portal while the human bodies are being taken over by demons. Buffy needs to find a way to get these beta testers (including a very reluctant Xander) back into the real world and destroy the evil demon who's using the testers to conjure a powerful being.

Continuity

Supposed to be set in Buffy season 5.

Canonical issues

Buffy books such as this one are not usually considered by fans as canonical. Some fans consider them stories from the imaginations of authors and artists, while other fans consider them as taking place in an alternative fictional reality. However unlike fan fiction, overviews summarising their story, written early in the writing process, were 'approved' by both Fox and Joss Whedon (or his office), and the books were therefore later published as official Buffy/Angel merchandise.

External links

Reviews
Litefoot1969.bravepages.com - Review of this book by Litefoot
Teen-books.com - Reviews of this book
Nika-summers.com - Review of this book by Nika Summers
Shadowcat.name - Review of this book

2002 American novels
2002 fantasy novels
Books based on Buffy the Vampire Slayer
Novels by Mel Odom